Oscar Peterson Live! is a 1986 live album by Oscar Peterson.

Track listing
 The Bach Suite: "Allegro" – 9:51
 The Bach Suite: "Andante" – 3:24
 The Bach Suite: "Bach's Blues" – 9:11
 "City Lights" – 7:08
 Medley: "Perdido" (Juan Tizol, Hans J. Lengsfelder, Ervin Drake) – 6:26
 Medley: "Caravan" (Duke Ellington, Irving Mills, Tizol) – 6:39
 "If You Only Knew" – 7:56

All music composed by Oscar Peterson, unless otherwise noted.

Personnel
 Oscar Peterson – piano
 Joe Pass – guitar
 David Young – double bass
 Martin Drew – drums

References

Oscar Peterson live albums
Albums produced by Oscar Peterson
1986 live albums
Pablo Records live albums